C. Eric Olsen, Jr. (March 26, 1916 – May 7, 1993) was an American sailor. He competed in the 12m² Sharpie event at the 1956 Summer Olympics. Olsen was a member of the Duxbury Yacht Club in the 1940s and 1950s.

References

External links
 

1916 births
1993 deaths
American male sailors (sport)
Olympic sailors of the United States
Sailors at the 1956 Summer Olympics – 12 m2 Sharpie
People from Brookline, Massachusetts